"All I Have to Do Is Dream" is a song made famous by the Everly Brothers, written by Boudleaux Bryant of the husband-and-wife songwriting team Felice and Boudleaux Bryant, and published in 1958. The song is ranked No. 141 on the Rolling Stone magazine's list of The 500 Greatest Songs of All Time. The song is in AABA form.

The Everly Brothers' original version 
The best-known version was recorded by the Everly Brothers at RCA Studio Nashville and released as a single in April 1958. It had been recorded by the Everly Brothers live in just two takes on March 6, 1958, and features Chet Atkins on guitar. It was the only single ever to be at No. 1 on all of the Billboard singles charts simultaneously, on June 2, 1958. It first reached No. 1 on the "Most played by Jockeys" and "Top 100" charts on May 19, 1958, and remained there for five and three weeks, respectively; with the August 1958 introduction of the Billboard Hot 100 chart, the song ended the year at No. 2. "All I Have to Do Is Dream" also hit No. 1 on the R&B chart as well as becoming the Everly Brothers' third chart topper on the country chart. The Everly Brothers briefly returned to the Hot 100 in 1961 with this song.

Outside the United States, "All I Have to Do Is Dream" saw massive success in various countries, most notably the United Kingdom, where it topped the UK's New Musical Express chart in June 1958 and remained there for seven weeks (including one week as a joint number one with Vic Damone's "On the Street Where You Live"), spending 21 weeks on the chart in Britain. The song has also featured on several notable lists of the best songs or singles of all time, including British music magazine Qs 1001 best songs ever in 2003.

It was named one of the "500 Songs that Shaped Rock and Roll" by the Rock and Roll Hall of Fame and received the Grammy Hall of Fame Award in 2004.

The B-side, "Claudette", was the first major song writing success for Roy Orbison (who also recorded his own version of the song) and was named after his first wife. As a result of this success Orbison terminated his contract with Sun Records and affiliated himself with the Everly's publisher, Acuff-Rose Music.

Personnel
 Don Everly – lead vocals and acoustic guitar
 Phil Everly – lead vocals and acoustic guitar
 Chet Atkins – electric guitar
 Floyd Chance – upright bass

Certifications

Cover versions

Richard Chamberlain covered the song on his 1962 album Richard Chamberlain Sings. Released as a single in 1963, it peaked at No. 14 on the Billboard Hot 100 chart, and No. 6 on Billboards Middle-Road Singles chart.

Roy Orbison covered the song on his 1963 album In Dreams. 

Bobbie Gentry and Glen Campbell released a duet version in 1969. Their version reached No. 27 on the Billboard Hot 100, No. 6 on Billboards Hot Country Singles chart, No. 4 on Billboards Easy Listening chart, No. 3 on the UK Singles Chart, No. 6 in Sweden (Radio Sweden), and No. 3 in South Africa (Springbok Radio).

Donny Osmond's cover version appeared on his 1972 album Portrait of Donny.

The Nitty Gritty Dirt Band's version, from their 1975 album Symphonion Dream, reached No. 66 on the Billboard Hot 100, No. 30 on Billboards Easy Listening chart, and No. 79 on Billboards Hot Country Singles chart.

Andy Gibb and Victoria Principal peaked at no. 51 on the Billboard Hot 100 in 1981 with their remake.

R.E.M. contributed their rendition titled "Dream (All I Have to Do)" to the Athens, GA: Inside/Out soundtrack in 1987.

British singer Cliff Richard, singing with Phil Everly, recorded a version of the song that peaked at No. 14 on the UK Singles Chart in 1994.

The Dandy Warhols recorded a cover version for the covers compilation soundtrack released in support of video game Stubbs the Zombie in 2005.

French singer Laurent Voulzy recorded a version of the song in a duet with Andrea Corr. It was featured on his album La Septième Vague, recorded in 2006 and on the Corrs album Dreams: The Ultimate Corrs Collection, also recorded in 2006.

At the 1994 AFI Life Achievement Award, which was awarded to Jack Nicholson, Harry Dean Stanton and Art Garfunkel performed a rendition of the song for Nicholson.

Brandi Carlile performed the song at the 2021 Rock and Roll Hall of Fame Induction Ceremony.

Milwaukee native, Patrick Hackett (2022)

References

1958 singles
1963 singles
1969 singles
1981 singles
Songs written by Felice and Boudleaux Bryant
The Everly Brothers songs
Richard Chamberlain songs
Cliff Richard songs
Glen Campbell songs
Bobbie Gentry songs
Andy Gibb songs
Jan and Dean songs
Nitty Gritty Dirt Band songs
Ant & Dec songs
Billboard Top 100 number-one singles
Cashbox number-one singles
Number-one singles in Canada
UK Singles Chart number-one singles
MGM Records singles
Capitol Records singles
Rockabilly songs
Songs about loneliness
Songs about dreams
1958 songs
Jangle pop songs
Cadence Records singles
Grammy Hall of Fame Award recipients
1950s ballads
Barry Manilow songs